This article presents a list of the historical events and publications of Australian literature during 1957.

Books 
 James Aldridge – I Wish He Would Not Die
 Martin Boyd – Outbreak of Love
 Jon Cleary – The Green Helmet
 Nino Culotta – They're a Weird Mob
 Elizabeth Harrower – Down in the City
 D'Arcy Niland – Call Me When the Cross Turns Over
 Vance Palmer – Seedtime
 Ruth Park – One-a-Pecker, Two-a-Pecker
 Nevil Shute – On the Beach
 Randolph Stow – The Bystander
 Arthur Upfield – The Bushman Who Came Back
 Judah Waten – Shares in Murder
 Morris West – The Big Story
 Patrick White – Voss

Short stories 
 John Morrison – "A Man's World"
 Vance Palmer – The Rainbow Bird and Other Stories
 Steele Rudd – Sandy's Selection and Back At Our Selection
 Dal Stivens – The Scholarly Mouse and Other Tales
 Judah Waten – "The Knife"
 Patrick White – "On the Balcony"
 Amy Witting – "A Bottle of Tears"

Children's and Young Adult fiction 
 Nan Chauncy – Tiger in the Bush
 Enid Moodie Heddle – The Boomerang Book of Legendary Tales (edited) illustrated by Nancy Parker
 Joan Phipson – It Happened One Summer
 Patricia Wrightson – The Bunyip Hole

Poetry 

 David Campbell – "On Frosty Days"
 Mary Gilmore – Poems
 Max Harris
 "At the Circus"
 "The Death of Bert Sassenowsky"
 William Hart-Smith – "Boomerang"
 Gwen Harwood – "Panther and Peacock"
 Nancy Keesing & Douglas Stewart – Old Bush Songs and Rhymes of Colonial Times (edited)
 Henry Kendall & T. Inglis Moore – Selected Poems of Henry Kendall
 Jack Lindsay – Three Elegies
 James McAuley – "Aubade"
 Leonard Mann – Elegaic and Other Poems
 Ian Mudie – "I Wouldn't be Lord Mayor"
 Kenneth Slessor – Poems
 Douglas Stewart – "The Silkworms"
 Randolph Stow – Act One : Poems
 Colin Thiele – "Bert Schulz"
 Judith Wright – New Land, New Language : An Anthology of Australian Verse (edited)

Plays 

 Richard Beynon – The Shifting Heart

Awards and honours

Literary

Children's and Young Adult

Poetry

Births 

A list, ordered by date of birth (and, if the date is either unspecified or repeated, ordered alphabetically by surname) of births in 1957 of Australian literary figures, authors of written works or literature-related individuals follows, including year of death.

 18 February – Kim Scott, novelist
 31 March – Hannie Rayson, playwright
 2 June – Sara Douglass, novelist (died 2011)
 29 July – Liam Davison, novelist and critic (died 2014)
 11 November – Michelle de Kretser, novelist

Unknown date
 Tony Birch, novelist and critic
 Anthony Lawrence, poet
 Lucy Sussex, novelist and critic
 Brenda Walker, novelist

Deaths 

A list, ordered by date of death (and, if the date is either unspecified or repeated, ordered alphabetically by surname) of deaths in 1957 of Australian literary figures, authors of written works or literature-related individuals follows, including year of birth.

 13 October – Will Lawson, poet and novelist (born 1876)

See also 
 1957 in Australia
 1957 in literature
1957 in poetry
 List of years in Australian literature
List of years in literature

References

 
Australian literature by year
20th-century Australian literature
1957 in literature